Baker Peak may be:

Baker Peak (Idaho)
Baker Peak, in the Snake Range of Nevada
Baker Peak (Vermont), a mountain in Vermont

See also
 Baker (disambiguation)
 Baker Mountain (disambiguation)
 Mount Baker (disambiguation)